Overlanding or 4WD Touring is self-reliant overland travel to remote destinations where the journey is the principal goal. Typically, but not exclusively, it is accomplished with mechanized off-road capable transport (from bicycles to trucks) where the principal form of lodging is camping, often lasting for extended lengths of time (months to years) and spanning international boundaries.

History
Historically, "overlanding" is an Australian term to denote the droving of livestock over very long distances to open up new country or to take livestock to market far from grazing grounds. Between 1906 and 1910 Alfred Canning opened up the Canning Stock Route. In Australia overlanding was inspired to a large degree by Len Beadell who, in the 1940s and 1950s, constructed many of the roads that opened up the Australian Outback to colonizers. 
Those roads are still used today by Australian overlanders and still hold the names Len gave them; the Gunbarrel Highway, the Connie Sue Highway (named after his daughter), and the Anne Beadell Highway (named after his wife).

Overlanding in its most modern form with the use of mechanized transport began in the middle of the last century with the advent of commercially available four-wheel-drive trucks (Mercedes-Benz G-Class's, Unimog, Jeeps and Land Rovers). Nonetheless, there were a few earlier pioneers travelling in remarkably unsophisticated vehicles. 

In the early 1920s, John Weston and family travelled from Britain to Greece and back in a converted US built Commerce one ton truck with a Continental N engine. At the time, the Weston family was based in Europe but returned to South Africa, their homeland, in 1924, taking the vehicle with them. In 1931, the family set out in the same truck from the south-western tip of Africa and drove to Cairo and on to Britain. Not only is this story well-documented but remarkably the vehicle is still extant. In 1975, following renovation, it featured in the International Veteran and Vintage Car Rally from Durban to Cape Town and was then donated to the Winterton Museum, KwaZulu Natal, South Africa, where it can be seen today.

In 1949, with the Land Rover brand less than a year old, Colonel Leblanc drove his brand new 80-inch Series I Land Rover from the United Kingdom to Abyssinia.

There followed many more private journeys, with many groups setting out from Europe for remote African destinations. To aid in these endeavors the Automobile Association of South Africa published a guide titled Trans-African Highways, A Route Book of the Main Trunk Roads in Africa.
The first edition appeared in 1949 and included sections on choice of vehicle, choice of starting time, petrol supplies, water, provisions, equipment, rules of the road, government officials and rest houses. The serious tone of this book gives some clue as to the magnitude of such a trip, and it was from these beginnings that overlanding developed in Europe and Africa. Notable early examples include Barbara Toy's solo overland journeys in a Land Rover, including one in 1951-2 from Tangier to Baghdad, and the 1955-6 Oxford and Cambridge Far Eastern Expedition, which travelled overland from London to Singapore, also in Land Rovers.

One of the most well documented overland journeys was by Horatio Nelson Jackson in 1903. In 1954, Helen and Frank Schreider drove and sailed the length of the Americas from Circle, Alaska on the Arctic Circle to Ushuaia, Tierra del Fuego in a sea-going ex-army jeep.

In 2015 the Overlanding Association was created to provide help, support and information to overlanders. To date they have lobbied the European commission and the FIA to improve the rights of Carnet users in Europe.

Modern overlanding
Overlanding has increased in recent history, and is getting ever more popular in large part influenced by the Camel Trophy event run from 1980 to 2000 with routes crossing some intensely difficult terrain. It is now quite common for groups of overlanders to organize meetings, and an annual meeting is held every Christmas at Ushuaia. Through the use of the Internet it is much easier to find the information required for extended overland trips in foreign lands and there are several internet forums where travelers can exchange information and tips as well as coordinate planning. While some commercially built overland capable vehicles are produced, 
many overlanders consider the preparation of their vehicle a paramount part of the experience. The U.S., South Africa and Australia have significant industries based on making accessories for overland travel.

Commercial overlanding

The late 1960s saw the advent of commercial overland travel. Companies started offering overland tours to groups in large, specially equipped trucks. Mostly in Africa, these journeys could last for months, and relied heavily on the participation of the paying passengers for food preparation, food purchasing and setting up camp. The ultimate of these adventures was always the 'trans', or the complete journey from Europe to Cape Town in South Africa. Commercial overlanding has since expanded to all the continents of the world. The Truck Surf Hotel is an overlanding vehicle which, when stationary, expands in five sections to form a two-story, five-room hotel, and moves from surf break to surf break along the Portuguese and Moroccan coasts.

Modes of overland travel

Rail 
At , the Trans-Siberian Railway is one of the longest overland journeys in existence today, taking seven days to reach Vladivostok from Moscow, and providing an alternative to air travel for journeys between Europe and Asia.

The Indian Pacific railway, completed in 1970, links Sydney and Perth in Australia. Covering  over four days, the railway includes the longest stretch of straight railway line in the world.

The introduction of Japan's high speed railway Tōkaidō Shinkansen in 1964 changed the face of rail travel.

Road 
The Silk Route (or Silk Road) historically connects the Mediterranean countries, Persia, India and China with each other. Today the route refers to overland journeys between Europe and China, taking either the northern route - through Russia and Kazakhstan - or the southern route - through Turkey, Iran, Pakistan and North India - to Urumqi or Xi'an in China. These routes are still popular today, with companies offering tours on the southern route.

Overland routes

Trans Africa 
Some of the longest and more traditional overland routes are in Africa. In 1959 the pioneering American trailer manufacturer Wally Byam and a caravan of trailers travelled the route from Cape Town to Cairo, via Rhodesia (now Zimbabwe and Zambia), Belgian Congo (now Democratic Republic of Congo), Uganda and north from Kenya. One of the longest current commercial routes is from Reykjavik, Iceland to Cape town, South Africa.

From the mid-1980s, the non-operation of the Aswan to Wadi Halfa ferry between Egypt and Sudan as well instability in Sudan, northern Uganda and Ethiopia, made the journey impossible. In recent years however, the Cape to Cairo and Cairo to Cape Town route has again become possible and increasingly popular both with commercial overland trucks carrying groups of 20 or so paying passengers as well as independent travellers on motorcycles or with four-wheel-drive vehicles.

The traditional Trans Africa route is from London to Nairobi, Kenya and Cape Town, South Africa. The route started in the 1970s and became popular with small companies using old Bedford four-wheel-drive trucks carrying about 24 people each, plus many independents, normally run by groups of friends in 4x4 Land Rovers heading out of London from November to March every year. The usual route was from Morocco to Algeria with a Sahara desert crossing into Niger in West Africa, continuing to Nigeria. This was followed by a month-long journey likened to Joseph Conrad's “Heart of Darkness” through the forests of Zaire (now Democratic Republic of Congo), surfacing into the relatively modern world in Kenya via Uganda. From Kenya the last leg was south through Tanzania to either Zimbabwe or South Africa.

This route has changed dramatically due to border closures and political instability creating no-go zones. The route has reversed itself somewhat over the last few years, with trucks now crossing from the north to the south of Africa, closely following the west coast all the way from Morocco to Cape Town with the biggest change in the route being made possible by the opening of Angola to tourism. The journey then continues through Southern and East Africa from Cape Town to Nairobi and on to Cairo.

Other routes 

In Africa, commercial overland travel began with Trans Africa and Cape to Cairo described above. From the mid-1980s eastern and southern Africa became more sought after by tourists and Nairobi to Cape Town is now the most travelled overland route in Africa.  As more tourists look for adventure trips that fit into their annual holiday, shorter sections of overland routes have become available such as two- to three-week round trip from Nairobi taking in Kenya and Uganda and the very popular Cape Town to Victoria Falls, Zimbabwe (travelling through the highlights of Namibia and Botswana).

Istanbul to Cairo, via Syria and Jordan, is a classic overland route. It is a route that has been travelled for centuries, particularly during the Ottoman Empire. Historically it overlapped with the Hajj, with many people covering all or part of the route as part of their pilgrimage to Mecca. Backpackers discovered it in the 1970s and 1980s, with hippies searching for spiritual peace who departed to Jerusalem from Istanbul instead of going to India via Iran, Afghanistan and Pakistan. After the peace treaty between Egypt and Israel, onward travel from Jerusalem to Cairo became a possibility.  It is now well travelled by backpackers and overland companies alike although the number of travellers journeying the route can be affected by any unrest in neighbouring countries.

Trans America Trail

Canning Stock Route

Trans Euro Trail

See also
Long-distance motorcycle riding
London–Calcutta bus service
Truck Surf Hotel
Van-dwelling
Stock route
Off-roading
Adventure travel

References

Further reading

Marr, James - City of Myths, River of Dreams (2013) .
Marr, James - Short Stories From A Long Continent - The Americas Overland (2018)  

Adventure travel
Ecotourism